There are currently 16 U.S. Routes—14 mainline routes and two official special routes—that exist entirely or partially in New York. In New York, U.S. Routes are mostly maintained by the New York State Department of Transportation (NYSDOT), with some exceptions. U.S. Routes in New York are generally directly referenced by NYSDOT with their number; however, the letter "U" is suffixed to the number of the route on reference markers and in internal documents if there is numerical duplication between a U.S. Route and a state route. Two such numerical duplications exist: U.S. Route 2 and New York State Route 2 (US 2 and NY 2; inventoried as "2U" and "2", respectively), and US 15 and NY 15 ("15U" and "15").

The "From" column indicates the southern or western terminus of the route; likewise, the "To" column indicates the northern or eastern terminus of the route. The "mi" and "km" columns give the length of the route in miles and kilometers, respectively. Designations that are shaded in dark gray are numbers not currently assigned to a highway.

Mainline routes

Special routes

Unofficial special routes (those not formally recognized by the American Association of State Highway and Transportation Officials):
U.S. Route 20 Truck (Silver Creek, New York)
U.S. Route 219 Business (Salamanca, New York)

See also

List of Interstate Highways in New York
List of State Routes in New York

References

 
U.S. Routes